John Lewden House is a historic home located at Christiana, New Castle County, Delaware.  It was built about 1770, and is a two-story, five bay, single pile, brick dwelling in the Georgian style. It has a center hall plan and the interior features original woodwork in the parlor and hall.  Also on the property is a contributing two-story brick carriage shed (c. 1800).

It was listed on the National Register of Historic Places in 1979.

References

Houses completed in 1770
Houses on the National Register of Historic Places in Delaware
Georgian architecture in Delaware
Houses in New Castle County, Delaware
National Register of Historic Places in New Castle County, Delaware
1770 establishments in Delaware